Thibert is a French surname. Notable people with the surname include:

Art Thibert, American comic book artist
Colin Thibert (born 1951), Swiss writer and screenwriter
Marie-Élaine Thibert (born 1982), Canadian singer

See also
Theudebert

French-language surnames